The 2013 Bushehr earthquake occurred with a moment magnitude of 6.3 on April 9 in Iran. The shock's epicenter was in the province of Bushehr, near the city of Khvormuj and the towns of Kaki and Shonbeh. At least 37 people were killed, mostly from the town of Shonbeh and villages of Shonbeh-Tasuj district, and an estimated 850 people were injured.

Tectonic setting
Iran lies within the complex zone of collision between the Arabian Plate and the Eurasian Plate. The earthquake was the result of thrust faulting on a NW-SE trending fault plane, consistent with continuing shortening of the Arabian Plate.

Earthquake
At 16:22 IRDT (11:52 UTC) on April 9, 2013, an earthquake with a magnitude of 6.3 struck the southwestern coast of Iran, in Bushehr Province. "Dozens" of aftershocks followed, most within the first hour of the main quake. The strongest aftershock had a magnitude of 5.6.

The area is home to ten thousand people and fifty villages. The United States Geological Survey (USGS) estimated that 80,000 people experienced strong tremors while several million felt light shaking.  The earthquake was felt in many countries around the Persian Gulf, including Qatar, Bahrain, Saudi Arabia, and the United Arab Emirates.

Damage
At least 37 people were killed and an estimated 850 were injured by the earthquake. Most of those killed were in the town of Shonbeh and villages of Shonbeh-Tasuj District. Of the injured, 100 required hospitalization.

Two villages in the Khvormuj district were reported to have been "levelled". Landslides caused by the earthquake were reported in Kaki City.  According to provincial governor Fereydun Hasanvand, 700 homes were damaged, affecting 200 families. Many residents in the Shonbeh District lost power and water services.  Residents took to the streets in search of safety as aftershock after aftershock hit.  A report by Iran's International Institute of Earthquake Engineering and Seismology stated that most of the buildings damaged were adobe buildings constructed in the last 50 years; and that 100 houses were destroyed, 1,000 people were left homeless, and that about $50 million in damage occurred.

The Bushehr Nuclear Power Plant was not damaged, according to its operator and the governor of the province.  It was built to withstand a magnitude 8 earthquake, according to an official.

Aftermath
Iran's Red Crescent Society and the Iranian Navy sent teams to Bushehr Province on the first night to deliver first aid.  Several helicopters from nearby provinces helped airlift in emergency supplies.  Temporary shelters were erected in the first week after the earthquake.

Three days of national mourning were announced on April 9.

See also
 List of earthquakes in 2013
 List of earthquakes in Iran

References

Further reading

External links

Major Earthquake Strikes Iran

2013 earthquakes
2013 in Iran
April 2013 events in Iran
Earthquakes in Iran